Kenyon A. Joyce was a major general in the United States Army. He commanded the 1st Cavalry Division and later IX Corps in World War II.

Joyce was a prominent cavalry officer in the early outset of the war and was a mentor to a young George S. Patton. He later appointed Dwight D. Eisenhower as a chief of staff and is considered to have played a strong role in his development. He had initially sought to promote Eisenhower to command of a division, but Army Chief of Staff George C. Marshall favored him for staff postings.

Joyce reached retirement age from the U.S. Army in 1943, at which point Eisenhower, by then a prominent officer in the European Theater, appointed him to the Allied Control Council for Italy.

Joyce died in January 1960, aged 80, and a funeral service was held at Fort Myer.

See also 
 List of commanders of 1st Cavalry Division (United States)

References

Notes

Sources
 
 
Generals of World War II

|-

Year of birth missing
1960 deaths
United States Army officers
United States Army generals of World War II
United States Army generals
United States Army personnel of World War I